The 73rd running of the Tour of Flanders cycling classic was held on 2 April 1989. It was won by Edwig Van Hooydonck after a 12-kilometer solo. 77 of 177 riders finished the race.

Race report
A group of seven with Edwig Van Hooydonck, Dag-Otto Lauritzen and Rolf Sørensen makes the decisive breakaway on the Berendries, 30 km from the finish. Lauritzen tries to go solo, but is caught by Van Hooydonck, who places a fierce attack on the Bosberg, 12 km from the finish, and maintains his effort to the line. Herman Frison wins the sprint for second before Lauritzen. At 22, Van Hooydonck becomes the youngest post-War winner of the Tour of Flanders.

Route
The race started in Sint-Niklaas and finished in Meerbeke (Ninove) – totaling 264 km.
The course featured 12 categorized climbs:

Results

External links
Video of the 1989 Tour of Flanders  on Sporza (in Dutch)

References

1989 
1989 in road cycling
1989 in Belgian sport
1989 UCI Road World Cup
April 1989 sports events in Europe